The 2012–13 LNB Pro A season was the 91st season of the French Basketball Championship and the 26th season since inception of the Ligue Nationale de Basketball (LNB).

The regular season started on October 5, 2012 and ended on April 30, 2013. Playoffs started on May 14 and ended on June 8, 2013. JSF Nanterre won their first title.

Promotion and relegation

Team arenas

Regular season

Season team leader(s)

Stats leaders

Playoffs

Awards

LNB awards 

Regular Season MVPs
 Foreign MVP :  Dwight Buycks (Gravelines-Dunkerque)
 French MVP :  Edwin Jackson (Lyon-Villeurbanne)

 Best scorer
   Sean May (Paris-Levallois)

Rising Star Award
  Livio Jean-Charles (Lyon-Villeurbanne)

Best Defensive Player
  Tony Dobbins (Poitiers)

Most Improved Player
  Edwin Jackson (Lyon-Villeurbanne)

Block Leader
  Rudy Gobert (Cholet)

Best Coach
  Christian Monschau (Gravelines-Dunkerque)

Finals MVP 
  David Lighty (Nanterre)

Player of the month

References

External links 
  LNB website

LNB Pro A seasons
French
basketball
basketball